Dahaneh Siah Darun (also Romanized as Dahaneh Sīāh Darūn; also known as Dahaneh Sīādarūd and Dahaneh Sīādarūn) is a village in Tula Rud Rural District, in the Central District of Talesh County, Gilan Province, Iran. At the 2006 census, its population was 385, in 80 families.

Language 
Linguistic composition of the village.

References 

Populated places in Talesh County

Azerbaijani settlements in Gilan Province

Talysh settlements in Gilan Province